Michael Hinz (born 7 May 1987) is a German footballer who plays as a goalkeeper for Blau-Weiß 1890 Berlin.

Career
Born in East Berlin, Hinz came through the youth teams of 1. FC Union Berlin, only to be told as a 13-year-old that he had no future at the club. Despite that, he returned four years later to help the club get promoted to the Under 19 Bundesliga. Hinz was rewarded with a call-up to the Germany national under-18 football team where he made one appearance in 2004.

Having only made 11 appearances until 2008, Hinz moved to FC Rot-Weiß Erfurt. On 18 April 2009, he made his professional debut for the first team in the 3. Liga as a second-half substitute for the injured Dirk Orlishausen in a match against SV Wacker Burghausen. A week later, he started the away game versus Kickers Emden.

Starting for FC Oberneuland, Hinz made two appearances in the first half of the 2009–10 Regionalliga season. After having spent the 2010–11 season without a club, he joined SV Germania Schöneiche, starting seven games in the latter half of the 2011–12 NOFV-Oberliga season before the club withdrew from the league. In 2012, Hinz joined FSV Union Fürstenwalde where he finally became a regular between the posts, starting all-but-one of the 2012–13 NOFV-Oberliga season's fixtures for the Brandenburg-based team that finished second to BFC Viktoria 1889 in the league. Hinz made 16 appearances the following season before moving to Berlin-Liga team Tennis Borussia Berlin.

References

External links
 
 Profile at FuPa.net

1987 births
Living people
Footballers from Berlin
German footballers
Association football goalkeepers
3. Liga players
Germany youth international footballers
1. FC Union Berlin players
FC Rot-Weiß Erfurt players
FC Oberneuland players
SV Germania Schöneiche players
Tennis Borussia Berlin players
FSV Union Fürstenwalde players